Steven Royce Parker (born September 21, 1959) is a former American football defensive end who played two seasons with the Baltimore/Indianapolis Colts of the National Football League. He first enrolled at Triton Junior College before transferring to Eastern Illinois University. He attended Evanston Township High School in Evanston, Illinois.

References

External links
Just Sports Stats

Living people
1959 births
Players of American football from Illinois
American football defensive ends
African-American players of American football
Triton College alumni
Eastern Illinois Panthers football players
Baltimore Colts players
Indianapolis Colts players
Sportspeople from Evanston, Illinois
21st-century African-American people
20th-century African-American sportspeople